Charles A. "Chuck" Wight is the ninth president of Salisbury University, a master's-level university located in Salisbury, Maryland.

Biography 
Born in Glen Cove, New York, Wight earned a B.S. in chemistry from the University of Virginia in 1977 and a Ph.D. in chemistry from the California Institute of Technology (Caltech), where his advisor was Jesse L. Beauchamp. After completing postdoctoral work for the University of Colorado, he spent nearly three decades as a chemistry faculty member then administrator at the University of Utah, where his roles included dean of the graduate school, assistant vice president of continuing education and others. He served as president of Weber State University in Ogden, Utah, from 2012-2018  and became the ninth president of Salisbury University in Salisbury, Maryland, on July 1, 2018.

Presidential tenure at Weber State University 
On Oct. 9, 2012, the Utah State Board of Regents selected Wight as president of Weber State University. He officially took over for President F. Ann Millner on Jan. 1, 2013, with an inauguration celebration on Oct. 22 of that year. During his inaugural address, Wight outlined five priorities: keeping college affordable, beautiful and sustainable campuses, innovative teaching, increasing campus diversity, and increasing connections between the university and community. Toward those ends, his tenure has included the creation of a chief diversity officer position within the university, the establishment of a college town charter between the university and Ogden City and the creation of the university's largest solar array. For the aforementioned college town charter and associated relationship, Ogden City and WSU received the 2015 Larry Abernathy Award from the Clemson Joint City University Board. The award, which recognizes excellent college town relationships, is given at the International Town & Gown Association's annual conference. Vice President for Administrative Services Norm Tarbox replaced Wight as acting president on May 1, 2018.

Presidential tenure at Salisbury University 
On Apr. 3, 2018, the University System of Maryland Board of Regents announced Wight had been selected as Salisbury University's ninth president. He officially succeeded President Janet Dudley-Eshbach on July 1, 2018. During his introduction to campus, he said he wanted SU to be “a school that continues to grow, and we want a school that continues to be higher and higher quality.”  He has since stressed his desire for a student-centric campus  and outlined goals similar to those he met at Weber State: college affordability, diversity and inclusion, maintaining a beautiful and sustainable campus, improving student success and building mutually positive relationships with the community.

On October 7, 2021, Wight announced that he would step down as President of Salisbury University on June 30, 2022, citing health concerns. Wight will be succeeded by Dr. Carolyn Ringer Lepre effective July 15, 2022.

Academic emphasis  
Wight has expertise in the chemistry of explosives, particularly the decomposition and combustion reactions of high explosives and propellants. His research has developed computational models of propellant combustion and detonation for use in simulations for the now-decommissioned Center for Simulation of Accidental Fires and Explosions (C-SAFE). Wight served as deputy director of C-SAFE from 2002 to 2010.

References

External links 

Year of birth missing (living people)
Living people
University of Virginia alumni
California Institute of Technology alumni
21st-century American chemists
University of Utah faculty
Presidents of Weber State University
People from Glen Cove, New York
Scientists from New York (state)
20th-century American chemists
20th-century American academics
21st-century American academics